Colonel John Bullock of Faulkbourne M.P. (31 December 1731 – 28 December 1809) was an English landowner and Member of Parliament for 56 years becoming Father of the House and a prominent member of the Bullock family.

Early years
John Bullock was born in 1731, the eldest surviving son of Josiah Bullock J.P. D.L. of Faulkbourne and Mincing Lane, London and Hannah Cooke, youngest daughter of Sir Thomas Cooke, Member of Parliament for Colchester and governor of East India Company.

He was educated as a fellow commoner at Clare Hall, Cambridge and at Lincoln's Inn (1750). He succeeded to Faulkbourne Hall on the death of his father in 1752.

Political career

At the age of 23, he embarked on a parliamentary career that lasted 56 years and culminated in him becoming father of the house until his death.

His period in the house spanned the Seven Years’ War, the War of American Independence, the French Revolution and the earlier Napoleonic Wars. He sat as a fellow member with the Pitts, Burke, Fox and Sheridan.

He commenced his parliamentary career in 1754 as member for Maldon; he was returned twice more for the borough in 1761 and in 1768 (polling 443 votes against the 455 of John Huske and the 328 of Jon Hennker). In 1774, he temporarily abandoned his parliamentary career for reasons of cost and it was not until 1780 that he returned to the house.

He was returned as member for Steyning in Sussex in 1780, which returned two members until the Reform Bill of 1832. Steyning began returning two Members of Parliament from 1278 and as a rotten borough made up of a depopulated port became similar to Dunwich until the Reform Act 1832.

In 1784, he shared the representation of the County of Essex with Thomas Bramston of Screens and sat as Whig Member for the county continuously and without contest for 26 years until his death in 1809. This absence of contest was due a "family compact", which was the outcome of the ruinous expenses of the two previous elections, by which for more than thirty years one Whig and one Tory were regularly returned. The colonel's second co-member was Admiral Harvey who commanded the “Téméraire” at Trafalgar.

The colonel is recorded as being a member of Boodle's club in St James's in 1787.

Despite the efforts of other parliamentarians, the colonel resisted attempts to make him understand the complexities of foreign affairs and his kinsman, the Duke of Bedford, described him as "a good-natured fox-hunting boy"; the colonel's grandfather was Edward Bullock MP, of Faulkbourne Hall (1663-1705), whose relative  was Elizabeth Howland, Duchess of Bedford, wife of Wriothesley Russell, 2nd Duke of Bedford.  Both the colonel and the Duke of Bedford had their portraits painted in the early 1770s by Thomas Gainsborough. Colonel Bullock never made a speech in Parliament during his career.

The long duration of the "compact" was due to the high respect in which Colonel Bullock was held throughout the county for his political independence and he was well-liked. At his death, the peaceful state of affairs came to an end.

Military service

He was a colonel in the East Essex Battalion Militia and is recorded at the second in command at the first mustering on 15 November 1759 and at the mustering on 19 April 1778 during the time of the American War of Independence.

Faulkbourne

He took a keen interest in Faulkbourne Hall and undertook many improvements to the house and grounds in the 18th century. A drawing shows a Palladianisation of the west front, but the later work seems to have taken it back to – and extended – the gothic original look. He ordered fine tapestries from Aubusson in France and armorial porcelain from China.

A patron of the arts, he founded a wide-ranging collection of pictures. In 1803, the house contained many good paintings by van Dyck, Van de Velde, Michelangelo, Sir William Beechey, Sartorius and other masters.

Family

Whilst his wife Elizabeth (née Lant) was a considerable heiress to large slum estates in Southwark of over 17 acres and containing 400 houses, he exhausted a large part of her fortune on Parliamentary life. She died in 1793 and they had no children. He left his estates on his death, in 1809, to his nephew, Jonathan Josiah Christopher Watson, son of his sister, Elizabeth who had married Jonathan Watson JP DL FRS of Ringhall in Suffolk. In 1810, Jonathan Josiah Christopher took the surname Bullock under the Royal sign-manual.

The death of the colonel without issue led to the first break in the regular family succession for more than 200 years, since John Bullock of Moulsham founded the Essex Branch of the family.

Gainsborough portrait
In the early 1770s, a fine portrait was painted by Gainsborough showing the colonel in full uniform resting his left elbow on a pedestal which supports a classic urn. In his right hand, he holds his laced hat. By his side sits a large Newfoundland dog. In the background are trees and water.

The Gainsborough portrait has been at auction several times in the past 25 years: it made £1.2m in 1987, and then £2.65m in 2002, both times setting a world record for Gainsborough. Before the 1987 sale it had been in the same British collection for 90 years - for a long time it was on loan to the government, and hung at 10 Downing St for two years.

See also
 Bullock family
 Faulkbourne
 Sir Edward Bullock
 Professor Walter Llewellyn Bullock
 Sir Christopher Bullock

References

1731 births
1809 deaths
People from Braintree District
Alumni of Clare Hall, Cambridge
Members of the Parliament of Great Britain for English constituencies
British MPs 1754–1761
British MPs 1761–1768
British MPs 1768–1774
British MPs 1780–1784
British MPs 1784–1790
British MPs 1790–1796
British MPs 1796–1800
Members of the Parliament of the United Kingdom for English constituencies
UK MPs 1801–1802
UK MPs 1802–1806
UK MPs 1806–1807
UK MPs 1807–1812
Members of Parliament for Maldon